Cumeré is a town in the Oio Region of Guinea-Bissau.

References

Populated places in Guinea-Bissau